The East Coast Conference Men's Basketball Player of the Year was a basketball award given to the East Coast Conference's most outstanding player. The award was first given following the 1974–75 season and was discontinued after the league folded following the 1993–94 season. In 1994 the East Coast Conference was absorbed into the Mid-Continent Conference, now known as the Summit League.

There were two ties in the award's history, 1982 and 1987.  In its first year, the ECC named Players of the Year for each division — with Wilbur Thomas of American named the East Player of the Year and Henry Horne of Lafayette winning the West award.

One player, Michael Brooks of La Salle, won the award three times (1978–1980) and was also named the national player of the year in 1980.  Two others, Michael Anderson of Drexel and Kurk Lee of Towson, won the award twice.

Key

Winners

Winners by school

Footnotes
 Delaware, Saint Joseph's, and West Chester were original members of the newly chartered ECC in 1974, having split off with the rest of the schools from the Middle Atlantic Conferences. Delaware left in 1991, while Saint Joseph's and West Chester left in 1982.

References
General
 1989–90 East Coast Conference Men's Basketball media guide, pp. 44–59
 2009–10 Towson Tigers Men's Basketball Media Guide, p. 77

Specific

NCAA Division I men's basketball conference players of the year
Player Of The Year
Awards established in 1975
Awards disestablished in 1994